Macaparana is a city located in the state of Pernambuco, Brazil. It has an estimated population of 25,472 inhabitants.

Geography
 State – Pernambuco
 Region – Zona da mata Pernambucana
 Boundaries – Paraiba state   (N and W);  São Vicente Ferrer and Vicência   (S);  Timbaúba   (E).
 Area – 
 Elevation – 
 Hydrography – Goiana River
 Vegetation – Subcaducifólia forest
 Climate – Hot tropical and humid
 Annual average temperature – 
 Distance to Recife –

Economy
The main economic activities in Macaparana are based in industry, commerce and agribusiness, especially sugarcane, bananas; and livestock such as cattle and poultry.

Economic indicators

Economy by Sector
2006

Health indicators

Twin towns — sister cities

Macaparana is twinned with:

References

Municipalities in Pernambuco